Scopula quadratisparsa is a moth of the family Geometridae. It is found on Borneo.

References

Moths described in 1976
quadratisparsa
Moths of Asia